There are few remaining flying examples of de Havilland Heron.  The following are owners or former operators of the aircraft:

♠ Original operators

Military operators

Force Publique ♠ 

 Ceylon
Royal Ceylon Air Force ♠ 
Sri Lanka Air Force

West German Air Force ♠

Ghana Air Force

Royal Iraqi Air Force ♠

Jordan Arab Air Force ♠
Royal Jordanian Air Force

 Katanga
Katangese Air Force

Directorate of Civil Aviation

Kuwait Air Force

Royal Malaysian Air Force ♠

Royal Moroccan Air Force purchased a single Heron on formation in 1956.

South African Air Force

Royal Air Force ♠ 
No. 60 Squadron RAF
Queen's Flight
Fleet Air Arm
781 Naval Air Squadron

Civil operators

Airlines of Tasmania this airline is not the present airline of the same name.
 Ansett-ANA
Altair
Amalgamated Air
 Associated Airlines ♠
 Butler Air Transport ♠ 
 Connellan Airways
Coveair
 Kendell Airlines
 Northern Airlines
 Qantas
 Southern Airlines
 Southern Airways

 Bahamas Airways ♠ 

 Gulf Aviation

 Sabena

 TAS – Transportes Aéreos Salvador ♠ 

 Department of Transport
 Newfoundland Air Transport

 Air Ivoire

ACES Colombia

 Cimber Air
 Dan-Fly
 Falcks Flyvetjeneste ♠

 Air Pacific
 Fiji Airways

 Air Paris
 Union Aéromaritime de Transport ♠ 

 Ghana Airways ♠

 Aeroservice S de RL

 Indian Airlines ♠ 

 Garuda Indonesia ♠ 

 Itavia
 Avio Linee Siciliane 

 British West Indian Airways

 All Nippon Airways
 Fuji Airlines
 Japan Air Lines ♠ 
 Japan Air Services
 Toa Domestic Airline

 Nigeria Airways
 West African Airways Corporation (joint venture between Nigeria, Gambia, Sierra Leone, and Ghana) ♠ 

 Air North
 National Airways Corporation ♠ 

 Braathens SAFE ♠ : Eight aircraft from 1952 to 1960
 Fjellfly Air Services
 Nor-Fly : One aircraft on magnetometric surveys, 1966 - 02.01.1969, when ac ditched in Vestfjorden.
 VLS - Vestlandske Flyselskap ♠ : One aircraft on service Stavanger - Bergen - Trondheim, 1956 - 1957.

 Transportes Aéreos de Timor

 Prinair

 Air Trans Africa

 Transportes Aéreos São Tomé

 St. Lucia Airways

 Sierra Leone Airways

Aviaco ♠

 Västerås Flygande Museum : US-registered example operated by museum. (modified with boxer engines).

 Sky of Siam

 Tongair

 Devlet Hava Yolları ♠ 
 Türk Hava Yolları

 Air Ecosse
 British Airways
 British European Airways ♠ 
 British United Airways
 British Westpoint Airlines
 Cambrian Airways ♠
 Channel Airways
 Cunard Eagle Airways
 Dragon Airways ♠ 
 Fairflight
 Ferranti
 Jersey Airlines ♠ 
 Mercury Airlines
 Morton Air Services
 Peters Aviation
 Progressive Airways
 Silver City Airways

  Air Idaho
  Air Pacific
 Albany Aero Club 
 Allegheny Commuter (Fischer Brothers Aviation)
 Baja Cortez Airlines
 Colony Airlines
 Florida Airways
 Great Plains Airways
 Hawaiian Air Tour Service (HATS)
 Illini Airlines ♠
 King Airlines
 Norstar
 North American Airlines
 Orange Blossom Commuter (AAT Airlines)
 Prinair
 Seagull Air
 Shawnee Airlines
 Swift Aire Lines
 Trans Magic Airlines
 Wright Airlines

 PLUNA ♠

References

 
 

Lists of military units and formations by aircraft
Heron
De Havilland Heron